Freya Holdaway (born 12 April 1989) is a Northern Irish former footballer who played as a defender and appeared for the Northern Ireland women's national team.

Career
Holdaway has been capped for the Northern Ireland national team, appearing for the team during the 2019 FIFA Women's World Cup qualifying cycle.

She had to retire from football in 2020 after three concussions.

References

External links
 
 
 

1989 births
Living people
Crystal Palace F.C. (Women) players
Women's association footballers from Northern Ireland
Northern Ireland women's international footballers
Women's association football defenders
Marshall Thundering Herd women's soccer players